"Me Voy" is a song by Mexican singer Julieta Venegas and is the first single from her fourth studio album, Limón y Sal (2006). Thus far, it is Venegas' most successful song.

It was released in Mexico on March 28, 2006, in Europe in 2007 and appeared in the top positions in Italy and Switzerland. The song was nominated for the Latin Grammy Awards of 2006 in Record of the Year and the video, directed by Picky Tallarico, for Best Short Form Music Video.

Song information

Written by Julieta Venegas and produced by Cachorro López, "Me Voy" is a Ranchera/Pop farewell song between two lovers. It is in the key of D major and 6/8 time.

Chart performance

The song reached the top of the US Billboard Latin Pop Airplay, also appears in the Hot Latin Tracks on #9. In Mexico the song spent place for twelve consecutive weeks on number-one, is certified as a gold record for sales in Mexico high as ringtone. On February 18, 2007, the song reached number 12 position in the Schweizer Hitparade. In Spain Me Voy was for 26 weeks on the radio reaching the top position. Venegas in Italy is positioned at number 3 of the radio and iTunes digital downloads is the number two position. In several Latin American countries is positioned at number-one.

Music video 

The video was directed by Picky Tallarico.

The video begins with Julieta Venegas in a room where she is singing to a man but he is sleeping. She packs her things and flies off in a hot air balloon. She lands in a desert where she builds herself a home amongst the animals. She grows tired of her life there, and she flies away again and lands at the South Pole. She tries to live as a fisher woman with an igloo house, but once again tires of her life. Her last attempt at a happy home lands her in a forest, but she leaves this place as well. The video ends with her flying off into the sunset in her hot air balloon.

Track listing 

Digital download
 "Me Voy" – 3:08

CD Single
 "Me Voy" – 3:08

European CD single and digital download
 "Me Voy" – 3:08
 "Lento" – 4:05

German CD Single
 "Me Voy" – 3:08
 "Andar Conmigo" – 3:15
 "Lento" – 4:00
 "Algo Está Cambiando" – 4:00
 "Me Voy" (Music video) – 3:08

Personnel

Songwriting, accordion, acoustic guitar, keyboards – Julieta Venegas
Production – Cachorro López
Bass – Guille Vadalá
Recording – Mark Rankin
Drums – Dany Ávila
Acoustic guitars – Ernesto Snajer
Percussions – Facundo Guevara
Mixing – César Sogbe
Mastering – José Blanco

Charts and certifications

Weekly charts

Year-end charts

Certifications

Release history

Awards and nominations 

Latin Grammy

Los Premios MTV

References 

2006 singles
Julieta Venegas songs
Number-one singles in Spain
Song recordings produced by Cachorro López
Songs written by Julieta Venegas